Replaceable or Replaceability may refer to:
 Replaceability (technology), the concept of interchangeable parts
 Replaceable parameter (DOS), in batch files
 "Replaceable" (CKY song)
 "Replaceable" (Killers song)

See also 
 Replaceability argument, a philosophical argument against vegetarianism
 Replacement (disambiguation)
 Interchangeability (disambiguation)